David Eden Lane (November 2, 1938 – May 28, 2007) was an American domestic terrorist, white separatist, neo-Nazi, and convicted felon. A member of the terror organization The Order, he was convicted and sentenced to 190 years in prison for racketeering, conspiracy, and violation of the civil rights of Alan Berg, a Jewish radio talk show host, who was murdered by another member of the group while Lane drove the getaway car on June 18, 1984. He died while incarcerated at the Federal Correctional Complex in Terre Haute, Indiana.

Lane coined the "Fourteen Words", a well known white supremacist slogan in North America. He has been described by the Southern Poverty Law Center as "one of the most important ideologues of contemporary white supremacy".

Background
Lane was born as the third of four siblings in Woden, Iowa; he had a brother and two sisters. His father was an alcoholic migrant worker who was physically abusive toward his wife and children. Lane would later claim that his father forced his mother to engage in prostitution so he could obtain "booze money", and that his older brother was rendered with permanent deafness as a result of a "beating gone awry". When Lane was four years old, his father abandoned his family. In 1944, his older brother was arrested after searching for food in a neighbor's trash bins, and he and his sisters were placed in foster care.  Lane was soon adopted by a traveling Lutheran minister, which resulted in Lane being separated from his two sisters. Lane described his adoptive father as a "doctrinaire fundamentalist from the old school". 

Lane rejected Christianity which he found boring. Inspired by Nazi religious beliefs, Lane later favored pagan beliefs as a more authentic ancestral "white" religion, as opposed to what he viewed as Jewish influenced Christianity. Travelling across the Midwestern United States with his adoptive family, Lane finally settled in Aurora, Colorado, where he attended Aurora Central High School. Originally aspiring to become a golf professional, Lane worked as a real estate broker until his license was revoked because he "wouldn't sell homes to coloreds in white neighborhoods".

Lane claimed that he first became attracted to women of the  "Caucasian race" after befriending a blonde-haired girl in first grade. Lane stated that while he reenacted battles with his foster brother as a child, he portrayed a Nazi stormtrooper while his brother portrayed an American soldier. Lane was briefly a member of the John Birch Society before joining the Ku Klux Klan, becoming the organizer of the Denver unit of the Knights of the Ku Klux Klan in 1979. In late 1981, Lane became Colorado State Organizer of the Aryan Nations.

Lane met Robert Jay Mathews in July 1983 at the Aryan Nations world congress. On September 22, 1983, Lane was among the nine founding members to be sworn into The Order, a white supremacist group whose mission was to deliver "our people from the Jew and bring total victory to the Aryan race." The Order was accused of stealing over $4.1 million in armored car hijackings, killing three people (one of whom was Order member Walter E. West), detonating bombs, counterfeiting money, organizing militaristic training camps and carrying out numerous other crimes with the ultimate goal of overthrowing the "Zionist occupational government" they deemed in control of the United States and to "liberate the Pacific Northwest as a homeland for whites" in the process (see Northwest Territorial Imperative).

Convictions and incarceration
For his role in The Order's crimes, Lane was sentenced to consecutive sentences totaling 190 years, including 20 years for racketeering, 20 years for conspiracy, both under the Racketeer Influenced and Corrupt Organizations Act (RICO), and 150 years for violating the civil rights of Alan Berg, a Jewish radio talk show host who was murdered on June 18, 1984. Berg was shot and killed in the driveway of his Denver home by three members of The Order. Lane was arrested on the evening of March 30, 1985, in Winston-Salem, North Carolina. While he did not pull the trigger, prosecutors said Lane drove the getaway car and played a large role in the planning of Berg's assassination.

Lane was also among 14 men prosecuted for seditious conspiracy in Fort Smith, Arkansas, but he was acquitted. Lane was considered extremely dangerous by the American justice system and was incarcerated at various times after his conviction in the United States Penitentiary, Marion, the United States Penitentiary Administrative Maximum Facility in Florence, Colorado, and the Federal Correctional Complex, Terre Haute.

While incarcerated, he had the Federal Bureau of Prisons ID # 12873–057. Lane wrote books and articles about gematria and the demographic and sociopolitical status of the white race for white nationalist periodicals and websites. With his wife and Ron McVan, he ran a publishing company called 14 Word Press in Idaho to disseminate his writings.

He was featured in Nazi Pop Twins, a documentary aired on July 19, 2007, on Channel 4 in the UK. In it he was shown speaking by phone with Prussian Blue (the music act from the documentary) and termed them "fantasy sweethearts" and that he viewed them like daughters.

Lane's earliest possible release date from prison would have been on March 29, 2035 (at age 96). He died on May 28, 2007, in FCC Terre Haute due to an epileptic seizure. On June 30, 2007, white supremacists held memorial demonstrations for Lane in cities across the United States, the United Kingdom, Germany, Russia, and Ukraine.

Beliefs

Racial beliefs
Lane stated that his beliefs can be best summarized by a slogan he called the "Fourteen Words": "We must secure the existence of our people and a future for White children." He also coined a second 14-word slogan: "because the beauty of the White Aryan woman must not perish from the earth."

Lane authored the 88 Precepts, a collection of statements on natural law, which are abbreviated "14-88," "14/88," or 14 words" in  white supremacist shorthand. In white nationalism, 88 is also a reference to "Heil Hitler".

Wotansvolk

Lane was one of the founders of the Wotansvolk movement, a racist, neo-völkisch form of Odinism (or Heathenry) which he formed with his wife Katja in 1995 in order to promote his ideology which pursued a program of concerted outreach to prisoners. Wotansvolk combines an "Aryan call to arms" with an esoteric teaching, based in part on Jungian psychology, völkish philosophy, and National Socialism.  Lane distanced himself from universalist Odinists (including "folkish Asatru") who did not embrace "survival of the Aryan race" as a core part of the movement. Lane argued with Stephen McNallen, then leader of the Asatru Folk Assembly when Lane was alive. By 2017, McNallen came out with support for Lane's 14 Words, quoting them verbatim.

Aiming at a white revolution, Wotansvolk endorsed "leaderless resistance," a strategy which was popularized by Louis Beam, a Klan veteran and a longtime friend of the Lane family. However, 14 Word Press and Temple of Wotan are defunct organizations and as a result no longer have mailing addresses or websites, although Wotanism is still practiced by independent kindreds.

Identifying Sir Francis Bacon with Shakespeare as being "adept in ancient divine wisdom" and believing that the pyramids were built by "Aryan architects", Lane taught a belief called the "Pyramid Prophecy 666", which included the concept that a Bible code was inserted by "Aryan adepts" within the King James Version of the Christian Bible. Lane's alleged deciphered code described him as being the "man" who is described in the Book of Revelation, with America being the Beast, but that belief was censored by Ron McVan and other strategists who believed that Lane's Messianic / Anti-Christ claims would be counterproductive by "turning off potential converts". Lane also issued a declaration called "Moral Authority", which calls the United States a "Red, White, and Blue travelling mass murder machine" intent on committing genocide against white people. According to the declaration, "true moral authority belongs to those who resist" this purported genocide.

References
Informational notes

Citations

Bibliography

External links

Archive of David Lane's profile in the Anti-Defamation League's "Extremism in America" series.

1938 births
2007 deaths
People from Hancock County, Iowa
American bank robbers
American conspiracy theorists
American neo-Nazis
American modern pagans
American people imprisoned on charges of terrorism
American people who died in prison custody
Founders of modern pagan movements
Aryan Nations
John Birch Society members
American Ku Klux Klan members
Inmates of ADX Florence
People convicted of depriving others of their civil rights
People convicted of racketeering
Prisoners who died in United States federal government detention
Deaths from epilepsy
Neurological disease deaths in Indiana
White supremacist assassins
20th-century American criminals
21st-century American criminals